Trivigliano is a comune (municipality) in the Province of Frosinone in the Italian region Lazio, located about  east of Rome and about  northwest of Frosinone, in the Monti Ernici area.

References

Cities and towns in Lazio